Submarine Squadron 6 (also known as SUBRON 6) is a squadron of submarines in the United States Navy based at Norfolk, Virginia under the command of Capt. Jason Pittman. The squadron uses  and  submarines.

Submarines in Squadron

Mission 
Submarine Squadron Six exercises operational control of Los Angeles-class attack submarines and Virginia-class submarines home ported in Norfolk, Virginia. The squadron is responsible for preparing submarine crews in all facets of operations, including tactical and operational readiness for war, inspection and monitoring duties, nuclear and radiological safety, and development and control of submarine operating schedules. SUBRON SIX also is responsible for matters pertaining to new submarine construction and for coordinating all submarine operations in the Virginia Capes Operating Areas, including logistical support and schedule deconfliction. In 2014, then-current commander, Paul Snodgrass stated, "The primary job at Squadron 6 is to train, mentor and certify crews for deployment. This broad range of responsibilities would be impossible without the dedication and hard work the squadron's staff of Sailors and civilians who eat, drink, and breathe submarining".

Consolidation with Submarine Squadron 8 
On April 28, 2011, Submarine Squadrons 6 and 8 merged under the command of Submarine Squadron 6.
Submarine Squadron 8 was reestablished on February 18, 2022. The squadron is responsible for the control of new submarine construction and ongoing submarine operating maintenance schedules of Los Angeles-class attack submarines and Virginia-class submarines homeported in Norfolk, Va.

Resources 

Military in Norfolk, Virginia
Submarines of the United States Navy
https://www.dvidshub.net/image/4608207/commander-submarine-squadron-6-change-command